Plantation High School (commonly referred to as PHS) is a high school located in Plantation, Florida, part of the Broward County Public Schools district. As of 2022, the school serves 1,931 students in grades 9 through 12. It was originally located on the Fort Lauderdale Airport grounds, specifically on the Naval Air Station Fort Lauderdale base. This was used as a temporary location until the new building was ready to open at its present location. Students at Plantation High are called "Colonels".  The original school logo was a graphic of a traditional Southern colonel—the equivalent of Colonel Reb, mascot of the University of Mississippi.  In the early 1990s, amidst concerns of racial insensitivity, the logo was changed to a large red letter "C" similar to the Chicago Bears logo.

Plantation High has an FCAT school grade of "C" for the 2018–2019 academic year. The school has been making great efforts to raise the school grade in recent years.

The school's attendance zone includes: Plantation, and a portion of Sunrise.

Clubs and organizations
Alongside its varied curriculum, PHS also possesses a wide list of clubs and organizations that cater to the diverse interests of the student body. The following list provides the school's official clubs:

 Amigos
 AOF - Academy of Finance (part of DECA) teaches students the fundamentals needed in the business world. It is a three-year program that includes an internship and annual competitions.  Students graduate with an additional diploma certifying the completion of the program.
 AOTT - Academy of Travel and Tourism (part of DECA) teaches students the fundamentals needed in the hospitality.
 Band
 Best Buddies - Focus is to enhance the lives of people with intellectual disabilities by developing friendships with members of the "Best Buddies" club.
 Bible Club - This is a club for those who read the bible; also associated with First Priority
 Cultural Society
 Drama Club - Members are able to participate in the PHS's theatrical productions. Members also have the opportunity to compete in various acting competitions; the Drama Club is also responsible for organizing the Senior Musical.
 French Club
 Gay-Straight Alliance (GSA)
 Health Occupations Students of America - Members of HOSA learn about careers in the growing health care system. Students learn hands-on skills and in their senior year go to clinics, the hospital, and work with patients and staff in real life situations.
 International Club   plantationhigh.browardschools.com-open to students of all cultures. Promotes cultural harmony and friendship.
 Key Club - Sponsored by a local Kiwanis Club, the Key Club is a service organization that dedicates itself to providing programs, literature and opportunities for students to relate to other teenagers across the globe.
 Mu Alpha Theta
 National Art Honor Society
 National Honor Society
 Newspaper Club - Students who are part of this club participate in creating the school's student-run newspaper, "The Colonel's Journal."
 Poetry Club
 Recycle Club
 Rocket Team (TARC/SLI)
 Save What's Left
 Step Team
 Student Government- SGA is a student-run organization that organizes inter-school related activities such as FunShop and Homecoming.
 SADD - Students Against Drunk Driving is a club dedicated to spreading awareness of the dangers of drunk driving to fellow students.

Athletics
The school's athletic teams are known as the PHS Colonels:

 Baseball
 Basketball
 Cheerleading
 Cross Country
 Flag Football
 Football
 Golf
 Soccer
 Softball
 Swimming & Diving
 Tennis
 Track and Field
 Volleyball
 Water Polo
 Wrestling
 Lacrosse

Academics
In the 2006–2007 school year, Plantation High School was the only school in Broward County to go up a letter grade based on FCAT scores. This has marked a turning point for a new era at this school.
Plantation High School has participated in the International Baccalaureate program since April 2010.

Demographics
As of the 2022-23 school year, the total student enrollment was 1,931. The ethnic makeup of the school was 7.5% White, 72.2% Black, 15.4% Hispanic, 1.8% Asian, 2.4% Multiracial, 0.5% Native American or Native Alaskan, and 0.2% Native Hawaiian or Pacific Islander.

Notable alumni
 Melanie Amaro, singer, first season of The X Factor USA winner, Class of 2010
 Neal Avron, record producer/audio engineer and musician, Class of 1983
 Al Blades, former NFL player
 H. B. Blades, former NFL player
 Chris Britton, former MLB player (Baltimore Orioles, New York Yankees)
 Jeremy Cash, NFL player (Carolina Panthers), Class of 2010
 Steve Curry, former MLB player (Boston Red Sox), Class of 1983
 Jack Hardy, former MLB player (Chicago White Sox)
 Carl Hiaasen, novelist and columnist, Class of 1970
 Zane Hijazi, YouTuber/Podcast Host, Class of 2010
 Heath Hussar, YouTuber/Podcast Host, Class of 2010
 Chris Lammons, NFL player
 Brandon McGee, former NFL player
 Jeff Owens, former NFL player, Class of 2007
 Charles Partridge, football head coach, Florida Atlantic University, 2014–16 
 Josh Robinson, NFL player (Minnesota Vikings), Class of 2009
 Ryan Shazier, NFL player (Pittsburgh Steelers), Class of 2011
 John Stanier, drummer, Helmet, Class of 1986
 Sojourn Shelton, NFL player (Cincinnati Bengals) Class of 2013
 Darrell Strong, former NFL player
 Xander Zayas  Professional Boxer

References

External links
Official Site
Plantation High School
School Profile
Broward County Public Schools

Educational institutions established in 1963
Broward County Public Schools
High schools in Broward County, Florida
Public high schools in Florida
Plantation, Florida
1963 establishments in Florida
International Baccalaureate schools in Florida